Hazel Hayes (born 21 January 1985) is an Irish YouTube filmmaker, author, and presenter. She is known for her interview series, Tipsy Talk, on her YouTube channel (formerly ChewingSand) as well as her series and short films. Her debut novel, Out Of Love, was published in 2020.

Early life and education
Hayes was born and raised in Dublin. She has an older sister and two older brothers. She graduated from Dublin City University in 2007, where she served as deputy president of the Student Union, with a Bachelor of Arts in Journalism. She then took classes at the Irish Writers' Centre.

Career
Hayes began her career working for Google and then YouTube as a manager before becoming a YouTuber herself.

Hayes began her interview series, Tipsy Talk in 2013 in which she interviews popular creators and later celebrities whilst intaking alcohol. She is also known for her short films and web series. Her 2014 short film, Dementia, was nominated for and won a work shop competition with Guillermo del Toro. Later, in 2017, she directed Fullscreen series Prank Me starring Corey Fogelmanis. The series earned her an Excellence in Storytelling award at the 2017 Buffer Festival. Other works includes her vlogs Time of the Month, web series Unnecessary Otter, pilot Hot Mess, and short films Super Brainy Zombies and Septem.

She has since directed dodie's music video for her song "Human" in 2018  and later 'I Kissed Someone (It Wasn't You)'  and Anna Akana's 2019 "Disappointment" music video.

In November 2018, Hayes announced her debut novel, Out of Love, a romance novel she would publish through Unbound. It was announced on its release date in June 2020 that Rabbit Track Pictures had picked up the rights to the novel, with Hayes writing and Kitty Kaletsky overseeing the film adaption.

Hayes began hosting Prime Video Club alongside Munya Chawawa for Amazon Prime Video in April 2020, a series discussing various series and films on the platform.

Personal life
Hayes moved to London in 2012 and lived with musician Dodie Clark for many years. She has since moved.

Hayes came out as bisexual in 2020.

Bibliography 
Out of Love (2020)

Filmography

Series
Unnecessary Otter (2014)
PrankMe (2017)

Short films
Super Brainy Zombies (2014)
Dementia (2014)
Septem (2015)
Sexy Torture Chamber (2015)
Not the John Lewis Christmas Advert (2015)
Happy (2016)
Hot Mess (2016)
Anxious (2018)

Music videos
"Human" (2018) - Dodie Clark
"Disappointment" (2019) - Anna Akana
"I Kissed Someone (It Wasn't You)" (2021) - Dodie Clark

Awards and nominations
Won Guillermo del Toro competition for Dementia.

References

External links
 

Living people
1985 births
21st-century Irish women writers
Alumni of Dublin City University
Irish expatriates in England
Irish film directors
Irish women novelists
Irish YouTubers
Irish women film directors
LGBT YouTubers